is a song by Japanese singer Kyary Pamyu Pamyu, released as a digital single on May 10, 2019. The song is used as the ending theme song of the YTV drama Mukai no Bazuru Kazoku.

Music video
The music video for the song was released on May 9, 2019.

Live performances
Kyary performed the song in Abema TV on May 5 and in Music Station on May 10, 2019. She performed the song with Goro Inagaki, Shingo Katori, and Tsuyoshi Kusanagi on her Abema TV performance.

Track listing

Charts

References

2019 singles
2019 songs
Kyary Pamyu Pamyu songs
Japanese television drama theme songs
Song recordings produced by Yasutaka Nakata
Songs written by Yasutaka Nakata